Ana Sözü is the largest local newspaper in Gagauzia (Moldova). It is also the only local newspaper still written entirely in Gagauz, and was the first newspaper of any kind published in the Gagauz language.

References

External links
Official website

Newspapers published in Moldova
Gagauzia
Newspapers established in 1988
Gagauz-language newspapers